Explorer 7 was a NASA satellite launched on 13 October 1959, at 15:30:04 GMT, by a Juno II launch vehicle from Cape Canaveral Air Force Station (CCAFS) to an orbit of  and inclination of 50.27°. It was designed to measure solar X-ray and Lyman-alpha flux, trapped energetic particles, and heavy primary cosmic rays. Secondary objectives included collecting data on micrometeoroid penetration, molecular sputtering and studying the Earth-atmosphere heat balance.

Satellite description 
The spin-stabilized satellite's external structure consisted of two truncated conical fiberglass shells joined by a cylindrical aluminum center section. The spacecraft was powered by approximately 3000 solar cells mounted on both the upper and lower shells. Additional power was provided by 15 rechargeable nickel-cadmium batteries that were positioned on its equator near the outer skin as an aid in maintaining a proper spin rate. Two crossed dipole (1 W, 20-MHz) telemetry antennas projected outward from the center section, and a 108-MHz antenna used for tracking was mounted on the bottom of the lower shell.

Located around the periphery of the center section were five bolometers for thermal radiation measurements and three cadmium sulfide micrometeoroid detector cells. A cylindrical ion chamber (lithium fluoride window) and a beryllium window X-ray chamber were located on opposite sides of the upper cone, and a cosmic-ray Geiger counter was located on the very top. A primary cosmic-ray ionization chamber was located within the center portion of the upper cone. Communications and tracking were provided by a 108-MHz transmitter at 15-mW designed to operate for 2 months and a 20-MHz transmitter at 600-mW powered by the solar cells designed for cut-off after about one year.

Experiments

Ground Based Ionospheric 
An all-transistor beacon telemetry transmitter was operated at a fundamental frequency of 19.9915 MHz. This transmitter, which was powered by solar cells and rechargeable nickel-cadmium batteries, provided 660-mW of power at the fundamental frequency. It also radiated the second and third harmonics (15-mW each) at 39.9830 and 59.9745-MHz. Beacon receivers were known to have been located in Washington, D.C., and Chicago, Illinois. Data were received over a period of 16 months.

Heavy Primary Cosmic Rays 
This experiment was designed to measure the omnidirectional flux of heavy primary cosmic rays in the rigidity range 1 to 15.5 GV. Particles with atomic numbers Z >5, Z >8, and Z >15 were counted separately by an ionization chamber in which each incident particle yielded a pulse. Pulse amplitude was substantially independent of the energy of the incident particle but was proportional to the square of its Z value. Each of the three counting rates was determined every 15 seconds. The experiment performed as planned from launch until 25 October 1959. About 80% of the data acquired for the 25 October 1959, to 31 May 1960, period are useful, with most problems occurring in the lowest Z mode. Very little useful data were acquired after 31 May 1960.

Micrometeorite 
Three photoconducting cadmium sulfide cells were used to measure micrometeorite penetration and molecular sputtering. The three cells were identical in design and effective area (18 sq mm) and were mounted on a magnesium plate on the satellite's equator facing outward perpendicular to the satellite's spin axis. The experiment was exposed to the space environment of micrometeorites, trapped radiation, and sputtering for 38 days of active life. The three cells and a thermistor that was included as part of the experiment performed normally. One cell was penetrated on the 16th day by a particle approximately 10 microns in diameter.

Solar X-Ray and Lyman-Alpha Radiation 
The solar X-ray and Lyman-alpha radiation were measured by means of gas ionization chambers mounted on opposite sides of the upper portion of the double cone configuration of the Explorer 7 satellite. Intensities were monitored in order to obtain a long-term history of solar X-ray and Lyman-alpha fluxes and to correlate these with terrestrial atmospheric responses. The two X-ray detectors ( deep) were filled with argon gas and had beryllium windows (.021 g/sq cm) resulting in a sensitivity to X-rays in the 2 to 8 A range. The Lyman-alpha detectors (on the opposite side), which were circular ionization chambers ( in diameter) filled with nitric oxide gas, had lithium fluoride windows. Their sensitivity was in the 1050 to 1350 A interval. The data, however, were impossible to interpret in terms of incident solar radiation due to both the saturation of detector circuits by Van Allen radiation (150 keV electrons) and electronic difficulties in the feedback amplifier.

Thermal Radiation 
The Explorer 7 thermal radiation experiment was designed to measure incident and reflected solar UV radiation and terrestrial IR radiation in order to obtain a better understanding of the driving forces of the Earth-atmosphere system. The primary instrumentation consisted of five bolometers in the form of hollow silver hemispheres that were thermally insulated from, but in close proximity to specially aluminized mirrors. The hemispheres thereby behaved very much like isolated spheres in space. Two of the hemispheres had black coatings and responded about equally to solar and terrestrial radiation. A third hemisphere, coated white, was more sensitive to terrestrial radiation than to solar radiation. A fourth, which had a gold metal surface, was more sensitive to solar radiation than to terrestrial radiation. The fifth hemisphere, protected from direct sunlight, was used to measure the reflected sunlight. A glass-coated bead thermistor was mounted on the top of each hemisphere to measure the temperature. A complete set of four temperature observations and one reference sample required 30 seconds. Thus, in each orbit, about 180 temperature measurements could be obtained. The experiment was a success, and usable data were obtained from launch until 28 February 1961.

Significantly, it also carried Dr. Verner E. Suomi's flat-plate radiometer, improved with the help of Robert Parent, that took the first Earth radiation budget measurements from space and initiated the era of satellite studies of the climate. It made the first coarse maps of "the solar radiation reflected by the Earth and the infrared radiation emitted by the Earth".

Using both satellite observations of the Earth's heat balance and atmospheric cooling rates measured by net flux radiosondes, Suomi established the important role played by clouds in absorbing radiated solar energy. These observations established that Earth's energy budget varies markedly due to the effect of clouds, the surface albedo, and other absorbing constituents. Using these instruments, Suomi and his team discovered that the Earth absorbed more of the Sun's energy than originally thought and demonstrated that it was possible to measure and quantify seasonal changes in the global heat budget. Explorer 7 was unable to detect solar X-rays due to its sensors being saturated by background radiation in the Van Allen radiation belt.

Trapped Radiation and Solar Protons 
Two omnidirectional Geiger counters (Anton 302 and 112) were used to conduct a comprehensive spatial and temporal monitoring of total cosmic-ray intensity, geomagnetically trapped corpuscular radiation, and solar protons. The detector was sensitive to protons (E >20 MeV) and electrons (E >30 keV). The experiment operated satisfactorily from launch until 28 February 1961, except for a brief period in September and October 1960.

Launch 
Launch was originally scheduled for late September 1959, but the mission was delayed for a week after a Jupiter IRBM test on an adjacent pad failed shortly after liftoff, causing flying debris to hit Explorer 7's launch vehicle. However, the damage to the booster was minor and could be easily repaired.

Explorer 7 was launched on a Juno II at 15:31 GMT on 13 October 1959 from the Atlantic Missile Range into a  orbit. On 16 June 1960, NASA announced one of the four frequency modulated subcarriers on the second transmitter had become erratic and the information it was transmitting on 3 of the 7 experiments was no longer intelligible. The tracking beacon ceased transmitting on 5 December 1959. Useful real-time data were transmitted from launch through February 1961 and intermittently until 24 August 1961. The spacecraft provided significant geophysical information on radiation and magnetic storms, demonstrated methods of controlling internal temperatures, recorded the first micrometeorite penetration of a sensor in flight, and detected large scale weather patterns.

Mission results 
It transmitted data continuously through to February 1961 and went dead on 24 August 1961. It is still in orbit.

See also 

 S-1 (satellite)
 Explorer program

References 

Spacecraft launched in 1959
Explorers Program
Satellites orbiting Earth
1959 in the United States
Earth observation satellites